The Indie Fund is an organization created by several independent game developers to help fund budding indie video game development.  The Indie Fund was created in early 2010, its purpose aimed "to encourage the next generation of game developers" by providing them funding for development of these games without the terms that would normally be associated with publication agreements.

The founding and current members of the Indie Fund include: Ron Carmel and Kyle Gabler of 2D Boy, Jonathan Blow, creator of Braid and The Witness, Kellee Santiago formerly of thatgamecompany and currently at Niantic, Nathan Vella of Capybara Games, Matthew Wegner of Flashbang Studios and Aaron Isaksen of AppAbove Games.

History
Members of the Indie Game organization have identified difficulties for indie developers to be able to fund their projects. Ron Carmel noted that there are typically two ways that this funding can occur: either through the developers providing their own money to initiate the project, or by signing deals with publishers for funding in exchange for part of the game's revenues being given back to the publisher.  Neither of these choices were considered optimal for an aspiring developer, according to Carmel.

In 2008, several self-published indie games, including Audiosurf, Braid, Castle Crashers, and World of Goo were released to both strong critical reception and large sales.  All of these games were initially funded by their respective studios, and demonstrated that investment in independent games could be profitable. With the following years also providing more commercially successful games, the Indie Fund group decided to create the fund, using the profits from these games, as to aid the next iteration of indie games.

Funding model

Investments in indie games are pulled from the Fund's reserves. Currently, the group states they can select two to three games that they can support per year, but they believe as the Fund expands, they can invest in more projects. Developers cannot directly apply for investment by the Fund; instead, the Fund watches the indie game market, observing games that get notice from the gaming press through both conferences and word-of-mouth, and selects candidate teams from these sources. The Fund provides monthly payments to the selected projects to cover development costs; upon release, the developers are expected to pay back the development funding and a small portion of the game's revenue over the next three years based on the level of funding required.  There is no penalty for failing to be able to pay back the full funding and revenue; should this occur within three years of release, the Fund requires no further payment, and all further revenue can be kept by the developers. The Fund allows the developer to retain all IP rights, and does not set any timetable for the development, only requesting monthly progress updates.

As an example, Q.U.B.E., the first Indie Fund-backed game to be released, had an original budget request of about $42,000 in August 2010; aware that it was apparently going over-budget, the Fund approved additional funding to bring the total investment to $90,000.  With four days of the title being released on the Steam software delivery platform, the title has sold 12,000 copies, sufficient to repay the investment. The second game, Dear Esther, cleared 16,000 units within 6 hours of being available on Steam, the revenue from that completely repaying the Indie Fund's contribution.

In February 2012, the Indie Fund changed their repayment model, now only asking for the initial investment back plus 25% of the revenues from sales through the first two years or until they have doubled their investment, whichever comes first.  This allows the Fund to allow for broader projects in size and scope, as well as take more risks on games that may not be as financially successful as others. One example is the decision to fund the game The Splatters in September 2012; though the game had previously been released to Xbox Live Arcade in April 2012, the game was considered unsuccessful but the developers, Spiky Snail, wanted to revise the title based on lessons learned and port it to more systems. The Indie Fund agreed to back the improvements, feeling that the developers had shown an understanding of the initial faults to assure a product that will overcome the risks of investment.

A further change was made in June 2015, allowing investors to decide how their funds can be distributed to the various games currently supported by the Indie Fund.

Funded games
At the 2011 Game Developers Conference, the Indie Fund announced the first three games that it had already funded Q.U.B.E. by Toxic Games (which would later be the first Indie Fund game to be released in December 2011), Monaco by Pocketwatch Games, and Shadow Physics by Scott Anderson and Steve Swink. The Indie Fund has also announced funding for one other yet-to-be-named titles from Double Fine Productions. The Indie Fund also provided $50,000 in funding for the development of That Dragon, Cancer.

References

External links

Indie video games
Funds